Varad may refer to:
 Oradea, city in Romania, also known as Várad
Varad, Bardoli, village in Gujarat, India